Stewart Greene (born Stewart Greenbaum (June 24, 1928 – June 29, 2019) was an American advertising executive and a founder of Wells Rich Greene, an advertising agency known for its creative work. The agency served such high-profile clients as Procter & Gamble, Samsonite, and American Motors, and developed the I Love New York campaign. By 1971, Wells Rich Greene was one of the top 25 advertising agencies in the country. Greene died on June 29, 2019, at age 91, as a result of cardiac arrest from complications of lung cancer.

References

1928 births
2019 deaths
American advertising executives
Deaths from lung cancer
Businesspeople from New York City
New York University alumni
Parsons School of Design alumni
People from Brooklyn
20th-century American businesspeople